Thurkaguda is a village in Ranga Reddy district in Telangana, India. It falls under Ibrahimpatnam mandal. One of the producers of dairy, vegetables to Hyderabad city.

References

Villages in Ranga Reddy district